The , also Frankenreiter thesis, is a thesis that is widely considered to be refuted in historical research and which claims Adolf Hitler's Jewish descent.

Referring to the parentage of Hitler's father Alois Hitler - who was born in 1837 as the illegitimate son of the housemaid Anna Maria Schicklgruber - which has not been clarified with absolute certainty - the Frankenberger thesis asserts that the unknown father of Hitler's father a Jewish merchant from Graz named Leopold Frankenberger (or Frankenreiter) - or his young son - and that Adolf Hitler was therefore a "quarter Jew" in the sense of the Nuremberg Race Laws later imposed by his own regime .

Origin of the thesis 
The Frankenberger thesis in its final form goes back to Hans Frank's memoirs published under the title In the face of the gallows. Frank, who had acted as Hitler's lawyer in the late 1920s and early 1930s, states that he was commissioned by Hitler in 1930 to discreetly investigate the various rumors circulating in the press and public at the time alleging Hitler's Jewish descent .

According to Frank, during detailed research he was able to unearth some circumstantial evidence that made these rumors appear not entirely unreasonable: Hitler's grandmother Anna Maria Schicklgruber worked as a housemaid or cook in the house of a Jew from Graz named Frankenberger in the 1830s . In 1837, when she was very pregnant, she returned to her home village, where her son Alois was born. The column for the child's father was left blank in the baptismal register, but Anna Maria Schicklgruber received financial support from Frankenberger for the next 14 years. The activity of the grandmother in Graz in 1837 is unlikely. It is more likely that she worked in Gratzen (today Nové Hrady, which is about a day's journey from her home village and where a Jewish merchant named Frankenberger allegedly lived at the time, which is also not verifiable.

Scientific evaluation of the thesis 
The validity of the Frankenberger thesis has been questioned in historical research since its inception. Consequently, it is rejected by most well-known researchers. Both Frankenberger's paternity and his status as a Jew are questioned.

As early as 1956, Franz Jetzinger pointed out that "the name Frankenberger [...] does not sound Jewish at all" and that it must therefore "first be proven" that Frankenberger - even if he was actually the father of Alois Hitler – actually was a Jew. Jetzinger also emphasized that "any evidence" was missing for alleged alimony payments. His conclusion is therefore: "Frank's report is at most sufficient to suspect Jewish descent, he does not guarantee a certainty."

In the 1960s, the archives of the city of Graz came to the conclusion that the alleged Frankenberger was probably identical to Leopold Frankenreiter: On the one hand, not a single Frankenberger could be found in the lists of residents of the city of Graz for the period in question and, on the other hand, this name corresponded to that Name attributed by Hitler's nephew William Patrick Hitler to Hitler's grandmother's employer. However, Frankenreiter was not of Jewish descent, but had been baptized Catholic with his entire family. However, even after this correction, the name Frankenberger remained the one to be found much more frequently in the literature.

Joachim Fest judged that "the lack of verifiable evidence [...] makes the thesis appear extremely questionable". Although Frank had little reason to knowingly falsely ascribe Hitler Jewish ancestors, "the thesis can hardly stand up to serious discussion". The "actual meaning" of the thesis lies "less in its objective validity". "Far more decisive and psychologically significant" was "that Hitler had to see his origins cast into doubt by Frank's results. […] Adolf Hitler did not know who his grandfather was.” Brigitte Hamann, on the other hand, wrote that "here the angry anti-Semite Frank wanted to blame the hated Jews for an allegedly Jewish Hitler and unsettle them with rumours".

Notable historians who dismiss the thesis are Ian Kershaw, Robert Payne, Walter Görlitz, Anton Joachimsthaler, Christian Graf von Krockow, John Toland, and Ernst Deuerlein.

Apart from serious historical research, the "revelation" of Hitler's "Jewish descent" has been taken up again and again by publications with a popular scientific, conspiracy theory or sensationalist impact. It is characteristic of this literature, which is almost unmanageable in its breadth, that it attempts to present source material that has been known for decades, in particular Frank's rumours, as new knowledge and in doing so fails to mention the continuous and almost unanimously skeptical and negative reception by the leading Hitler biographers.

Only more recent results on the question of Hitler's parentage were presented in 2009 by the Belgian journalist Jean-Paul Mulders. According to DNA samples, grandnephews and relatives of the dictator have the haplogroup E1b1b. Genealogical research finds this DNA trait more common in North Africans, Berbers, Somalians and Ashkenazi Jews than, for example, in Western Europeans and Germanic peoples. Only about 9% of the population of Germany and Austria exhibited this haplogroup, of which 80% had no Jewish ancestors.

External links 
 Der Spiegel, : Zeitgeschichte/Hitler-Abstammung: Dichte Inzucht
 Holocaust-Referenz: Hatte Hitler jüdische Vorfahren? „Wer mag das alles ausdeuten können!“
 DNA-Test: Genealogisch ist nicht von vorne herein auszuschließen, dass Hitler jüdische Vorfahren hatte

References 

Adolf Hitler